Larry Rohrbach (born November 12, 1946 in California, Missouri) is an American former Republican politician who served in the Missouri Senate and the Missouri House of Representatives where he rose to the level of House Assistant Minority Floor Leader.

Rohrbach graduated from the California, Missouri, public school system and from Central Missouri State University with a bachelor's degree in agribusiness.  He has worked as a farmer and has served in the U.S. Army from 1968 until 1970.  In 2014, Rohrbach announced his retirement from Missouri politics after 32 years in Jefferson City, Missouri.  After retiring from the state senate in 2002, he joined a then newly-founded lobbying firm.

References

1946 births
20th-century American politicians
Republican Party members of the Missouri House of Representatives
Republican Party Missouri state senators
Living people